South Korea competed at the 2014 Winter Olympics in Sochi, Russia from 7 to 23 February 2014. The team consisted of 71 athletes and 49 officials. This marks an increase of 25 athletes from four years prior. Originally 64 athletes were named to the team but reallocations brought the final team size to 71 athletes.

South Korea left Sochi with a total of 8 medals (3 gold, 3 silver, and 2 bronze), its lowest total at the Winter Olympics since 2002; female athletes won seven of these medals. With Pyeongchang being the host city of the 2018 Winter Olympics, a Korean segment was performed at the closing ceremony.

Medalists

Alpine skiing 

According to the quota allocation released on 27 January 2014, South Korea has qualified a total quota of five athletes in alpine skiing.

Biathlon 

Based on their performance at the 2012 and 2013 Biathlon World Championships South Korea qualified 1 man and 1 woman.

Bobsleigh 

* – Denotes the driver of each sled

Cross-country skiing 

According to the quota allocation released on 27 January 2014, South Korea has qualified a total quota of two athletes, each of them will compete only in classical events.

Curling 

Based on results from 2012 World Women's Curling Championship and the 2013 World Women's Curling Championship, South Korea has qualified their women's team as one of the seven highest ranked nations.

Women's Event – 1 team of 5 athletes
Kim Ji-sun
Lee Seul-bee
Shin Mi-sung
Gim Un-chi
Um Min-ji

Round-robin
South Korea has a bye in draws 1, 5 and 9.

Draw 2
Monday, February 11, 9:00

Draw 3
Tuesday, February 11, 19:00

Draw 4
Wednesday, February 12, 14:00

Draw 6
Thursday, February 13, 19:00

Draw 7
Friday, February 14, 14:00

Draw 8
Saturday, February 15, 9:00

Draw 10
Sunday, February 16, 14:00

Draw 11
Monday, February 17, 9:00

Draw 12
Monday, February 17, 19:00

Figure skating 

South Korea has achieved the following quota places: Three athletes were named to the team.

Freestyle skiing 

Halfpipe

Moguls

Luge 

Based on their performance at the 2013–14 Luge World Cup, South Korea has achieved a total quota of four athletes and a spot in the mixed team relay due to allocation.

Short track speed skating 

Based on their performance at the two World Cup events in November 2013 South Korea qualified a full team of 5 men and 5 women.

Noh Jin-kyu qualified for the team but broke his elbow on 14 January 2014 and will miss the Olympics. His replacement was named as Lee Ho-suk. Due to a conflict with or lack of support from the South Korean coaches and national short-track administrators, Ahn Hyun-soo, one of South Korea's best skaters, left the Korean team and competed for Russia in these Olympics. He defeated the Korean skaters in all four short track events and the Korean men were completely shut out of medals in these Olympics.

Men

Women

Qualification legend: ADV – Advanced due to being impeded by another skater; FA – Qualify to medal round; FB – Qualify to consolation round; AA – Advance to medal round due to being impeded by another skater

Skeleton 

South Korea has qualified two spots in the men's event for the first time in history on its fourth consecutive Olympics.

Ski jumping 

South Korea has received the following start quotas:

Snowboarding 

Alpine

Freestyle

Qualification Legend: QF – Qualify directly to final; QS – Qualify to semifinal

Speed skating 

Based on the results from the fall World Cups during the 2013–14 ISU Speed Skating World Cup season, South Korea has earned the following start quotas:

On 11 February 2014, Lee Sang-hwa won the gold medal for the women's 500m longtrack speedskating race, having previously won the one at the 2010 Games. She became the first woman since Catriona Le May Doan at the 2002 Games to defend her gold at the event. She became the third woman to win back-to-back golds at the 500m, and hence the first Korean woman to do so.

Men

Women

Team pursuit

See also
South Korea at the 2014 Summer Youth Olympics
South Korea at the 2014 Winter Paralympics

References

External links 

South Korea at the 2014 Winter Olympics

Korea, South
2014
Winter Olympics